The Hetland School, on Park St. in Hetland, South Dakota, was built in 1904.  It was listed on the National Register of Historic Places in 2002.   The listing included one contributing building and three contributing objects.

It was designed by C.A.  Johnson.  A 1920 addition was built by M.A. Melstad.

References

National Register of Historic Places in South Dakota
Italianate architecture in South Dakota
School buildings completed in 1904
Kingsbury County, South Dakota
Schools in South Dakota
1904 establishments in South Dakota